The Karl Deutsch Award is an award in the field of international relations to prominent scholars under 40 or within ten years of defending their doctoral dissertation. It was named after Karl Deutsch and was established in 1981 by the International Studies Association (ISA). The award is presented annually to a scholar who is judged to have made the most significant contribution to the study of International Relations and Peace Research by the means of publication.

It should not be confused with the Karl Deutsch Award awarded by the International Political Science Association, considered as the highest award in the field of comparative politics.

Criteria of recipients
Recipients must be a current member of ISA and under age 40, or within ten years of defending their doctoral dissertation.

Award
A $500.00 (USD) cash prize is awarded to the recipient. Previous nominees are eligible for the award so long as they meet the merit and age requirements.

Past recipients
Here is a list of the past recipients.

 1985 Bruce Bueno de Mesquita / Richard K. Ashley
 1986 Michael Wallace
 1987 Michael D. Ward
 1988 Steve Chan
 1989 Zeev Maoz
 1990 Joshua Goldstein
 1991 Jack Snyder
 1992 Duncan Snidal
 1993 Alex Mintz
 1994 James D. Morrow
 1995 T. Clifton Morgan
 1996 Robert Powell
 1997 Paul Huth
 1998 Paul Diehl
 1999 James Fearon
 2000 Edward D. Mansfield
 2001 Beth A. Simmons
 2002 Dan Reiter
 2003 Kenneth A. Schultz
 2004 Allan C. Stam
 2005 Alastair Smith
 2006 Christopher Gelpi
 2007 Kristian Skrede Gleditsch
 2008 Ashley Leeds
 2009 Jon Pevehouse
 2010 Virginia Page Fortna
 2011 Michael Tomz
 2012 Emilie Hafner-Burton
 2013 Jeremy M. Weinstein
 2014 Erica Chenoweth
 2015 Halvard Buhaug
 2016 Jacob Shapiro
 2017 Michael C. Horowitz
 2018 Jessica L.P. Weeks
 2019 Susan Hyde
2020 Nils B. Weidmann
2021 Joshua D. Kertzer

See also

 List of social sciences awards

References

External links
 

Social sciences awards